Jeremy George Weston "Jem" Marsh (15 April 1930 – 2 March 2015) was a British engineer, motor manufacturer and race driver, born in Clifton, Bristol, England. He entered the motor industry through his company Speedex Castings and Accessories Ltd., based in Luton, that manufactured and sold tuning parts for Austin Sevens, based on Marsh's successful Speedex750 racing special. Marsh is perhaps best known as a co-founder of the sports-car manufacturer Marcos, the name being derived from a contraction of his and fellow founder Frank Costin's surnames. Founded in 1959, the company was continued by Jem's son Chris Marsh, until it was taken over by Canadian Tony Stellinga, and continued to produce automobiles until 2008 when it ceased production.

References

External links
Total Sportscar article

1930 births
2015 deaths
British automobile designers
British founders of automobile manufacturers
English racing drivers
24 Hours of Le Mans drivers
English engineers
World Sportscar Championship drivers
20th-century English businesspeople